Valderrama is a Spanish surname. Notable people with the surname include:

Andrea Valderrama, American politician
Carlos Valderrama (footballer), Colombian football (soccer) player
Carlos Valderrama (baseball), Venezuelan baseball player
Gustavo Valderrama, Venezuelan volleyball player
Juan Valderrama, Spanish singer
Wilmer Valderrama, American actor
Eugeni Valderrama (born 1994), Spanish footballer

Spanish-language surnames